Teleopsia is a vision perception disorder, in which objects appear much farther away than they are.  Teleopsia is a disorder associated with dysmetropsia.

See also
Pelopsia

References

Eye diseases
Visual disturbances and blindness